The Joe F. Gurney Transfer Facility or Joe F. Gurney Unit (ND) is a Texas Department of Criminal Justice men's Transfer Unit located in unincorporated Anderson County, Texas.

It is named for Sergeant Joe F. Gurney. While working at Beto, Sergeant Gurney was killed when his horse fell and rolled over him.

Gallery

Notable Inmates
Scott Freeman, former voice actor for Funimation.

References

External links
 Gurney Unit - Texas Department of Criminal Justice

Prisons in Anderson County, Texas